John McHale may refer to:

 John McHale (baseball) (1921–2008), American baseball player and Major League Baseball executive 
 John McHale (footballer) (1915–2003), Australian rules football player
 John McHale (artist) (1922–1978), British artist, sociologist and specialist of future studies
 John McHale Jr., American lawyer and Major League Baseball executive; son of the baseball player

See also
 John MacHale (1791–1881), Irish Roman Catholic archbishop